Lem Peak is a mountain in Lemhi County, Idaho. At 3349m, it is the 16th highest summit in Idaho that has at least 500m of topographic prominence.

References 

Mountains of Idaho
Mountains of Lemhi County, Idaho